The 2019–20 Utah Runnin' Utes men's basketball team represented the University of Utah during the 2019–20 NCAA Division I men's basketball season. The team was led by ninth-year head coach Larry Krystkowiak. They played their home games at the Jon M. Huntsman Center in Salt Lake City, Utah as members of the Pac-12 Conference. They finished the season 16–15, 7–11 in Pac-12 play to finish in a three-way tie for eighth place. They lost in the first round of the Pac-12 tournament to Oregon State.

Previous season
The Utes finished the 2018–19 season finished the season 17–14, 11–7 in Pac-12 play to finish in third place. They lost in the quarterfinals of the Pac-12 tournament to Oregon.

Off-season
On August 6, 2019, the NCAA placed the Utes on two years probation due to impermissible recruiting activities in April 2018.

Departures

Incoming transfers

2019 recruiting class

2020 recruiting class

Regular season
On November 8, the Utes defeated Mississippi Valley State 143–49 to set an NCAA record for largest margin of victory (94 points) over a Division I opponent.

Roster

Schedule and results 

|-
!colspan=12 style=| Exhibition

|-
!colspan=12 style=| Non-conference regular season

|-
!colspan=12 style=| Pac-12 regular season

|-
!colspan=12 style=| Pac-12 tournament

Source

References

2019–20 Pac-12 Conference men's basketball season
2019-20 team
Utah Utes
Utah Utes